The Toronto Community Crisis Service (TCCS) is the non-police crisis intervention pilot program operated by the City of Toronto. The program runs in four areas of Toronto and partners with local community health agencies, which provides crisis workers. The program is integrated with the local 2-1-1 and 9-1-1 call centres.

History 
In 2020, in response to calls for police reform following the murder of George Floyd in the United States and a series of similar incidents in Toronto such as the death of Regis Korchinski-Paquet, Toronto City Council considered a series of motions aimed at reforming policing and crisis response in the city. Mayor John Tory tabled a motion to "detask" the Toronto Police Service. The city would explore how duties currently assigned to sworn officers would be assumed by "alternative models of community safety response" to incidents where neither violence nor weapons are at issue. Tory's motion passed unanimously on June 29.

City staff presented a report to the Executive Committee on January 27, 2021, which recommended the creation of a community crisis support service pilot program. The Executive Committee endorsed the report and it was later adopted by Toronto City Council on February 2. City council gave the Social Development, Finance and Administration Division (SDFA) the remainder of the year ot develop the non-police crisis response pilot.

Denise Campbell, the division's executive director indicated in April that some issues her team were considering included integration with 9-1-1 and 2-1-1 call centres, consultation with community and police, and the mandate of the program itself. A point of contention was the language of the program, whether it is non-emergency of crisis. According to Campbell, despite the word non-emergency, the goal is that the program would be able to respond to calls as fast as an ambulance. As a pilot project, the division aimed to target specific communities most at need. Three of the services areas were divided geographically, another pilot program was creating a team aimed at serving Indigenous communities. The program was projected to cost the city between $7.2 million to $7.9 million to operate each year.

On January 26, 2022, the Executive Committee approved SDFA's report outlining an implementation plan for the pilot program. It was subsequently adopted by city council on February 2. The first pilot was set to begin operating in the downtown east and northeast areas by March. Another pilot in the northwest as well as the Indigenous initiative in the downtown west was planned to begin operating in June. The community agencies chosen by the city were TAIBU Community Health Centre, the Gerstein Crisis Centre, the Canadian Mental Health Association, ENAGB Indigenous Youth Agency and the 2-Spirited People of the 1st Nations. According to Mayor Tory, "the pilots will allow the city to test and to evaluate and to revise this model before we implement it on a larger scale but make no mistake it is our intention to implement it on a larger scale and to have it city-wide by 2025 at the latest".

The first pilot in the downtown east launched on March 31, 2022, the northeast pilot launched on April 4, and the northwest and downtown west pilots launched in July.

Program areas and agencies

Downtown East 
The downtown east pilot includes TPS 51 and 52 divisions. Its boundaries are:

 North: Bloor Street to the Prince Edward Viaduct
 East: Don River to Lake Shore Boulevard to the Don Roadway
 South: Lake Ontario
 West: Spadina Avenue

The agency responsible for this pilot area is the Gerstein Crisis Centre.

Downtown West 
The downtown west pilot overlaps with TPS 14 division. Its boundaries are:

 North: Canadian Pacific Railway line
 East: Spadina Avenue and Lower Spadina Avenue
 South: Lake Ontario
 West: Dufferin Street south to Queen Street, west to Roncesvalles Avenue, south from Roncesvalles Avenue to Lake Ontario

The agency responsible is 2-Spirited People of the 1st Nations and ENAGB Indigenous Youth Agency. This pilot area focuses on the Indigenous community.

Northeast 
The northeast pilot encompasses most of Scarborough, and TPS 41, 42 and 42 divisions. Its boundaries are:

 North: Steeles Avenue
 East: City of Pickering border Little Rouge River, Rouge River
 South: Highway 401 west to Brimley Road, south from Brimley Road to Lake Ontario
 West: Victoria Park Avenue

The agency responsible for the pilot area is the TAIBU Community Health Centre.

Northwest 
The northwest pilot encompasses TPS 23 and 31 divisions. Its boundaries are:

 North: Steeles Avenue
 East: Canadian National Railway Line south to Highway 401, east to the Humber River
 South: Highway 401 east to the Humber River and south to Eglinton Avenue
 West: Highway 427

The agency responsible is the Canadian Mental Health Association.

References 

Crisis hotlines
Mental health organizations in Canada
Municipal government of Toronto
2022 establishments in Ontario